{{Infobox comics creator
| name          = Masakazu Katsura
| name_nonEN    = 桂 正和
| image         = Masakazu Katsura - Lucca Comics & Games 2014.JPG
| image_size    = 
| caption       = Masakazu Katsura at Lucca Comics & Games 2014
| alt           = 
| bodyclass     =
| birth_name    = 
| birth_date    = 
| birth_place   = Fukui, Japan
| death_date    = 
| death_place   = 
| nationality   = Japanese
| area          = Manga artist, artist, character designer
| alias         = 
| signature     = 
| signature_alt = 
| notable works = Video Girl Ai, I"s, Zetman
| collaborators = 
| awards        = Tezuka Award (1980, 1981)
| module        = 
| website       =
| nonUS         = 
| subcat        = 
}}

 is a Japanese manga artist, known for several works of manga, including Wing-Man, Shadow Lady, DNA², Video Girl Ai, I"s, and Zetman. He has also worked as character designer for Iria: Zeiram the Animation, Tiger & Bunny and Garo -Guren no Tsuki-, as well as the video game Astral Chain.Career
Masakazu Katsura was born in the prefecture of Fukui in Japan. The turning point in his life was an illness for which he was bedridden, during which time he taught himself a different way to draw. Katsura entered the manga industry in his second or third year of high school, when he entered a work for the Tezuka Award to win the prize money. However, he says he did not grow up reading manga, instead he read novels and watched movies.Video Girl Ai was made into an original video animation and has been released in North America. A live-action movie was also made of the story. The five-volume series DNA² was adapted into a television anime series and concluded with a short OVA, both were also released in North America. I"s was adapted into two OVA series: one two-episode side story, and one six-episode summary of the manga.

Katsura also performed as a vocalist on the songs "Tomorrow Will Be Tomorrow" and "Unseen Dream" from the two soundtracks for the Video Girl Ai OVA.

In 2008, he collaborated with Akira Toriyama, his good friend and creator of Dragon Ball and Dr. Slump, for the Jump SQ one-shot Sachie-chan Good!!. The two became friends in the early 1980s, having been introduced by their mutual editor Kazuhiko Torishima, and have even parodied each other in their own manga. Toriyama credits Katsura with coming up with the idea to have two characters "fuse" together in Dragon Ball, leading to the Fusion technique. However, Katsura says this is only a rumor; while he did in fact suggest it to him, he knows that Toriyama was not listening and claims Toriyama later thought it up on his own. They worked together again in 2009, for the three-chapter one-shot Jiya in Weekly Young Jump.

Also in 2008, Katsura did a design illustration of the Batman costume for Bandai's "Movie Realization" action figure line, basing it on the costume used in the film The Dark Knight.

Works
Manga
 Wing-Man (1983–1985)
 
 
 Zetman (4 one-shots from 1989 to 1994, serialized 2002–2014)
 
Includes Video Girl Ai and Video Girl Len Shadow Lady (1992–1993, 1995–1996)
 
 M (1996)
 I"s (1997–1999)
 Dr Chambalee (2000)
 
 

Other works
 Iria: Zeiram the Animation  (OVA, character designs, 1994)
 Love & Destroy (video game, character designs, 1999)
 Bitch's Life (3 pages, 2001)
 Tiger & Bunny (anime, character designs, 2011)
 Garo: Crimson Moon (anime, character designs, 2015)The Girl in Twilight (multimedia franchise, character designs, 2018)Astral Chain'' (video game, character design, 2019)

References

External links

 Official website
 

 
1962 births
Anime character designers
Living people
Manga artists from Fukui Prefecture